This is a list of the National Register of Historic Places listings in Fillmore County, Nebraska.

This is intended to be a complete list of the properties and districts on the National Register of Historic Places in Fillmore County, Nebraska, United States.  The locations of National Register properties and districts for which the latitude and longitude coordinates are included below, may be seen in a map.

There are 18 properties and districts listed on the National Register in the county, and one former listing.

Current listings

|}

Former listings

|}

See also
 List of National Historic Landmarks in Nebraska
 National Register of Historic Places listings in Nebraska

External links

 –Nebraska State Historical Society

References

Buildings and structures in Fillmore County, Nebraska
 
Fillmore